Carex sarawaketensis is a tussock-forming perennial in the family Cyperaceae. It is native to parts of New Guinea.

See also
 List of Carex species

References

sarawaketensis
Plants described in 1938
Taxa named by Georg Kükenthal
Flora of New Guinea